Rogério Apolónio de Sousa (18 April 1910 – 1976) was a Portuguese footballer who played as an outside forward.

Club career
Born in Funchal, Madeira, during the time of the constitutional monarchy, which would last a further six months. In his youth he started to play football with a leather ball in the extreme poverty of Madeira.

He joined Benfica in 1932, where he would play as outside forward in a typical 2–3–2–3 formation supporting Vítor Silva, Valadas or Espírito Santo. In his first season, he helped the club stop a 12-year winless run in the Campeonato de Lisboa.

In 1936–37 Primeira Liga, he was the team topscorer with 19 league goals, 32 in all competitions, as Benfica conquer their second league title. His last game for Benfica was a 2–1 win over Carcavelinhos on 16 June 1940.

Honours
Benfica
Primeira Divisão (6)
Taça de Portugal (2)
Campeonato de Portugal (1)
Campeonato de Lisboa (1)

References

External links

1910 births
1976 deaths
Sportspeople from Funchal
Portuguese footballers
Association football forwards
Primeira Liga players
S.L. Benfica footballers